Richard Pazdur is an American oncologist serving as the founding director of the Oncology Center of Excellence within the Food and Drug Administration. He was appointed to the position in 2005. He was previously the director of the FDA's Office of Hematology Oncology Products from 1999 to 2005.

Career 
Richard earned a Bachelor of Science degree from Northwestern University in 1973, followed by a Doctor of Medicine from Loyola University Stritch School of Medicine. He then did his fellowship at Rush-Presbyterian-St. Luke's Medical Center. He was on the faculty of Wayne State University from 1982 to 1988. He would then join MD Anderson Cancer Center from 1988 to 1999.

Pazdur is best known for growing the FDA oncology center from a small generalized division to over hundreds of oncologists across a number of specialties. He was credited with achieving faster approval times for cancer drugs. The office was formed as the Office of Hematology and Oncology Products (OHOP) in 2005 before being launched as the Oncology Center of Excellence in 2017 as part of the Cancer Moonshot Initiative.

Personal life
Pazdur grew up in Calumet City, Illinois. Pazdur met his wife Mary, an oncology nurse practitioner, while training at Rush-Presbyterian-St. Luke's Medical Center. They were married in Chicago prior to starting his new position at Wayne State.

References 

American oncologists
Food and Drug Administration people
Living people
Year of birth missing (living people)
Northwestern University alumni
Loyola University Chicago alumni